Brian Steen Nielsen (born 28 December 1968) is a Danish former professional footballer who played as a defensive midfielder. Most notably, he made 66 appearances for the Denmark national team between 1990 and 2002, scoring three goals. After his retirement from his active career, he worked as the director of football at former club AGF until 2014.

Biography
Born in Vejle, Steen Nielsen started his senior career at Vejle Boldklub (VB) in October 1988. He received the 1989 Danish U21 Player of the Year award, and on 14 February 1990 he debuted for the Denmark national team. He came on as a half-time substitute in a friendly match 0–0 draw with Egypt, but he did not become a constant part of the team, playing three further games until June 1991. He switched from Vejle to rival team Odense Boldklub (OB) in 1992, where he won the 1993 Danish Cup trophy. After a year at OB, he made the jump abroad to play in Turkey for Fenerbahçe.

The move to Fenerbahçe saw him return to the Danish national team in 1993, and during the last years of coach Richard Møller Nielsen's reign, Brian Steen was a part of the defensive midfield, playing many games alongside John "Faxe" Jensen. He moved back to play for OB in 1995, who he represented when he competed for Denmark in the UEFA Euro 1996. After the championship, he moved to Japan to play for Urawa Red Diamonds, and following Møller Nielsen's retirement as Denmark coach in June 1996, Brian Steen was eventually dropped by new coach Bo Johansson.

He moved back to OB once more in 1997, before playing for Akademisk Boldklub (AB), where his experience made him the natural team captain. His time at AB culminated in the 1999 Danish Cup triumph, at which time he had returned to the national team where he played a number of games in a midfield pairing with hard-hitter Stig Tøfting. Following the emergence of the eight-year younger Thomas Gravesen on the national team, Brian Steen slowly took on the role of substitute following the UEFA Euro 2000. After 11 minutes of play in the 2002 FIFA World Cup, under new coach Morten Olsen, his national team career had come to an end.

He ended his club career in Denmark with AGF, playing his last years alongside Stig Tøfting, though his stay at the club would be marked by him head-butting teammate Nikolaj Hust at the club training. He was not sued by Hust, but the press got hold of the news and Brian Steen was charged by the police and was convicted of mild violence, resulting in ten £50 fines. He stopped his career at Aarhus GF in the fall of 2004, but stayed around the club, both as a caretaker manager and he is the current sports director.

In April 2016, it was made public that his name was found amongst those in the Panama Papers.  Allegedly, he set up a company in Panama with the intent of evading Danish tax.

Career statistics

Club

International

Honours
OB
 Danish Cup: 1993

AB
 Danish Cup: 1999

Denmark
 FIFA Confederations Cup: 1995

References

External links
 National team profile
 Vejle Boldklub profile 
  
 
 

1968 births
Living people
1995 King Fahd Cup players
2002 FIFA World Cup players
FIFA Confederations Cup-winning players
Expatriate footballers in Japan
Expatriate footballers in Turkey
Danish men's footballers
Danish expatriate sportspeople in Japan
Denmark international footballers
Fenerbahçe S.K. footballers
Aarhus Gymnastikforening players
Odense Boldklub players
Akademisk Boldklub players
Vejle Boldklub players
Malmö FF players
Urawa Red Diamonds players
Danish Superliga players
Danish 1st Division players
Allsvenskan players
Süper Lig players
J1 League players
Danish expatriate men's footballers
Danish expatriate sportspeople in Turkey
UEFA Euro 1996 players
UEFA Euro 2000 players
People from Vejle Municipality
People named in the Panama Papers
Association football midfielders
Sportspeople from the Region of Southern Denmark